Bebbia, common name sweetbush, is a genus of aromatic shrubs in the family Asteraceae.

It is native to the southwestern United States (California, Nevada, Arizona, southwestern Utah, southwestern New Mexico, and extreme western Texas (El Paso County)) and northern Mexico (Sonora, Baja California, Baja California Sur). It bears plentiful yellow discoid flowers.

Species
Some authors combine the entire genus into one species, B. juncea. The Global Compositae Checklist  and The Plant List accept two species, with B. juncea divided into two varieties:
Bebbia atriplicifolia (A.Gray) Greene - Baja California Sur
Bebbia juncea (Benth.) Greene 
Bebbia juncea var. juncea
Bebbia juncea var. aspera (Benth.) Greene

References

External links
Jepson Manual Treatment of Bebbia
USDA Plants Profile for Bebbia
 Calflora Database: Bebbia native to California
Photo gallery

Millerieae
Monotypic Asteraceae genera
North American desert flora
Flora of Northwestern Mexico
Flora of the Southwestern United States
Flora of the South-Central United States
Flora of California
Flora of the California desert regions
Flora of the Chihuahuan Desert
Flora of the Sonoran Deserts
Natural history of the California chaparral and woodlands
Natural history of the Colorado Desert
Natural history of the Mojave Desert
Natural history of the Peninsular Ranges
Taxa named by Edward Lee Greene